The Biographical Encyclopedia of Astronomers (BEA) is a two-volume biographical dictionary, first published in 2007, with a second edition released in 2014. The work covers astronomers from all geographies, born from antiquity to mid-1918. It includes more than 1500 biographies of both well-known and more obscure astronomers, produced by 410 contributors.

The encyclopedia has been published in both a print and online format by the publisher, Springer.

Editions

References

External links

 Publisher's webpage (1st Edition)
 Publisher's webpage (2nd Edition)

Astronomers
Historiography of science
21st-century encyclopedias
2007 non-fiction books